Turbinicarpus is a genus of  very small to medium-sized cacti, which inhabit the north-eastern regions of Mexico, in particular the states of San Luis Potosí, Guanajuato, Nuevo León, Querétaro, Hidalgo, Coahuila, Tamaulipas and Zacatecas.

Taxonomy
The taxon was first proposed by Curt Backeberg as Strombocactus subgenus Turbinicarpus. It was elevated to a genus in 1937 by Franz Buxbaum and Backeberg. The circumscription of Turbinicarpus has been described as "remarkably unstable", with species regularly transferred to other genera. Its taxonomic history is often mixed with that of other genera like Echinocactus, Echinomastus, Gymnocactus, Mammillaria, Neolloydia, Normanbokea, Pediocactus, Pelecyphora, Strombocactus, Thelocactus and Toumeya, as the results of almost two centuries of constant evolution in the understanding of the affinities and relationships inside the family Cactaceae. A genus revision by Davide Donati in 2003, and again in 2004 with Carlo Zanovello, was based on a wide range of characters. At the end of that study, Rapicactus was considered a distinct genus from Turbinicarpus. The genus Turbinicarpus was subdivided in two subgenera at the light of the results of the DNA analysis, and into many series because of the ontogeny of the spination. The broad circumscription of Turbinicarpus was recognized as polyphyletic by Hunt in 2016. A phylogenetic study published in 2019 showed that both Kadenicarpus and Rapicactus were distinct from a more narrowly circumscribed and so monophyletic Turbinicarpus:

Species
, Plants of the World Online accepted the following species and hybrids:

Natural hybrids

Synonymy
The following genera haven been brought into synonymy with Turbinicarpus:
Gymnocactus Backeb.
Normanbokea Kladiwa & Buxb.

Ecology

These succulent plants grow mostly on limestone soil (never on volcanic soil), at altitudes between 300 and 3300 metres above sea level.

Turbinicarpus species are usually confined to specific habitats, generally hostile for the majority of plants, mostly in very drained rocky areas, composed of limestone, sandstone, schist (neutral or alkaline), or in very acidic and humiferous understorey, or in gypsum veins, sometimes so pure that they are almost white.

In particular, Turbinicarpus sensu stricto is adapted to extreme niches: more than 80% of the species grow in rock cracks or among the pebbles beneath them, where enough dust has accumulated to enable root development. It would seem almost impossible that plants so small could survive in such an environment, however in those species that inhabit dry and exposed areas, the root is very thick, becoming a taproot and acting like an anchor on the slopes but, more important, as water storage for the dry periods, capable of significantly retracting into the ground so that the stem is less exposed to the sun; the spines are often changed to adopt a very papery structure, capable of absorbing good quantities of water. Furthermore, the general look is extremely mimetic, thanks to the epidermis colour and the interlacing spines, guaranteeing a certain protection from eventual herbivores.

References 

Edward F. Anderson, The Cactus Family (Timber Press, 2001), pp. 665–673
Grupo San Luis, The Genus Turbinicarpus in San Luis Potosì (Ed. Cactus&Co, 2004)

External links
"Alkaloids and why Turbinicarpus sp. contain them" (Turbinicarpus Information Exchange)
 ("Lost Peyotls")

 
Medicinal plants
Cactoideae genera